The Liaoning Flying Leopards, also known as the Liaoning Shenyang Sansheng Flying Leopard Club or Liaoning Bengang (simplified Chinese: 辽宁本钢), are a Chinese professional basketball team based in Hunnan District, Shenyang, Liaoning, which plays in the Northern Division of the Chinese Basketball Association (CBA). The team used to hold home games in Benxi, at the Benxi Gymnasium, but relocated to Shenyang in the 2017–18 season. The Liaoning 3SBio Inc. is the club's corporate sponsor while its mascot is a flying leopard. The team plays at the Liaoning Gymnasium.

History
During the 2004–05 CBA season, Liaoning finished in first place in the North Division, but lost in the Quarter-Finals of the CBA Playoffs to the South Division's Yunnan Bulls. The team would then go on to place seventh and fourth, respectively, over the next two years, before advancing to the CBA Finals following the 2007–08 CBA season. Although Liaoning eventually lost to the Guangdong Southern Tigers, the club did win the fourth game of the series. This was the team's first victory in the CBA Finals, despite multiple appearances. After finishing in fifth place in the 2009–10 CBA season, Liaoning would miss both the 2010–11 and the 2011–12 CBA playoffs.

In 2011, Liaoning Scale Industry took over sponsorship from the Liaoning Panpan Group Co., Ltd.

Before the 2012–13 CBA season began, the roster received a massive upheaval. Liaoning made multiple changes including the signings of Josh Akognon and Alexander Johnson. Meanwhile, veteran Bian Qiang retired, and many local players were either transferred or loaned out to other CBA teams. One of the most significant player transactions that occurred was the decision to let go of Zhang Qingpeng. It would later be revealed that this move was made in the interest of developing sharpshooter Guo Ailun. On December 2, 2012, the Flying Leopards beat the Tianjin Gold Lions 100–81. This was Liaoning's sixth straight home victory against Tianjin.

In 2013, the team started to receive sponsorship from Benxi Steel Group.

The Flying Leopards have since become regular contenders for the CBA title again, powered by such players as Guo, Han Dejun, and multi-time CBA International MVP Lester Hudson. Liaoning lost to the Beijing Ducks in six games in the 2015 CBA Finals, and to Sichuan Blue Whales in five games in the 2016 CBA Finals. After Game 3 of the 2016 Finals, a brawl broke between players from the visiting Liaoning Flying Leopards and fans of the Sichuan Blue Whales.

In the 2017–18 CBA season, Liaoning defeated Zhejiang Lions in the finals (4–0) and won their first CBA league title. The team relocated their home stadium from Benxi to Shenyang during the play-offs semi-finals.

In 2019, 3SBio Inc. officially took the sponsorship, and changed the team name. In the 2020–21 season, former national team player Yang Ming became the new head coach. In the 2021–22 season, they won their second CBA title after sweeping Zhejiang Lions 4–0 in the final, the same as in 2018.

Players

Current roster

Honours
Chinese Basketball Association (CBA)
Winners (2): 2017–18, 2021–22
Runners-up (8): 1996–97, 1997–98, 1998–99, 2007–08, 2014–15, 2015–16, 2019–20, 2020–21

Notable players 

 Guo Shiqiang (1990s)
 Li Xiaoyong (1990s)
 Wang Zhidan (1990s)
 Wu Naiqun (1990s)
 Wu Qinglong (1990s)
 Zhang Qingpeng (2001–2014)
 Eric Riley (2002–2003)
 Ernest Brown (2003–2004, 2006–2008)
 Li Xiaoxu (2005–present)
 Jamal Sampson (2007–2008)
 Awvee Storey (2008–2009)
 Keith Closs (2009)
 Lorenzen Wright (2009)
 Olumide Oyedeji (2009–2010)
 Chris Richard (2010–2011)
 Donta Smith (2010–2011)
 Han Dejun (2010–present)
 Guo Ailun (2010–present)
 Rodney Carney (2011–2012)
 Josh Powell (2011–2012)
 Shavlik Randolph (2011–2012, 2015–2017)
 Liu Zhixuan (2012–2022)
 Josh Akognon (2012–2013)
 Alexander Johnson (2012–2013)
 Solomon Jones (2013)
 Vernon Macklin (2013)
 Dominique Jones (2013–2014)
 Hakim Warrick (2013–2014)
 Zhao Jiwei (2013–present)
 Lester Hudson (2014–2015, 2015–2019)
 Brandon Bass (2017–2020)
 Lance Stephenson (2019)
 O. J. Mayo (2020–2021)
 Jonathon Simmons (2020–2021)
 Zhang Zhenlin (2020–present)
 Kyle Fogg (2021–present)
 Jeremy Tyler (2021)
 Eric Moreland (2021–present)
 JaKarr Sampson (2022–present)

References

External links
 Club Profile at Sina.com 

 
Chinese Basketball Association teams
Sport in Liaoning
Basketball teams established in 1995
1995 establishments in China